Ovronnaz is a village located in the canton of Valais, Switzerland. It lies in the municipality of Leytron, close to Martigny.

The village is located on the south side of the Bernese Alps, on a terrace above the Rhone river, at an altitude of 1,330 metres.  The region is surrounded by the summits of Grand Chavalard, Petit and Grand Muveran and Haut de Cry.

Ovronnaz is both a small ski resort and a spa resort.

External links 
 

Villages in Switzerland
Ski areas and resorts in Switzerland
Spa towns in Switzerland